The Pacific Pilotage Authority is a Crown corporation of the Government of Canada that is responsible for pilotage through coastal waters in British Columbia, including the Fraser River.

It was established by the Pilotage Act in 1972 as a result of recommendations made by the Royal Commission on Pilotage in Canada.

References 

Transport Canada
Canadian federal Crown corporations
Transport companies established in 1972
Water transport in British Columbia
1972 establishments in British Columbia